Bonamia brevifolia is a herb in the family Convolvulaceae.

References

brevifolia
Plants described in 1968